Humanity & Inclusion (formerly Handicap International) is an international non-governmental organization. It was founded in 1982 to provide help in refugee camps in Cambodia and Thailand. Headquartered in France and Belgium, since its creation, it has opened branches in six other countries : Switzerland, Luxembourg, United Kingdom, Germany, Canada and the United States.

It is an organization which aims to help disabled and vulnerable people in situations of poverty and exclusion, conflict and disaster. More than 3,500 field staff are currently located in more than 60 countries worldwide.

History
The organization was founded in France by two French doctors in 1982 to help people affected by landmines in Cambodian refugee camps. The first orthopedic centers were set up in refugee camps in Thailand, Cambodia, Burma and Laos. Simple, locally available equipment was used to provide immediate, effective and practical aid, and local teams carried out the work. In 1986, Handicap International Belgium was set up, and the organization began to extend its work to other countries.

It is one of the 6 founding members of the International Campaign to Ban Landmines which received the Nobel Peace Prize in 1997. Since February 2005, the organization has also been calling for a ban on cluster munitions and conducting research documenting the human impact of these weapons. Humanity & Inclusion is a founding member of the Cluster Munition Coalition, an international civil society campaign that works to erase the production and storage of all the munition. In February 2006, Belgium became the first country to enact such a ban as a result of Handicap International's public awareness and advocacy efforts. Handicap International has been a vocal advocate of the Convention on Cluster Munitions (CCM), an international treaty banning the use, transfer and stockpile of these weapons adopted on 30 May 2008 in Dublin, Ireland. There are currently 68 states that have ratified the CCM and 43 non-ratifying signatories.

Humanity & Inclusion won the prize of the 2011 Conrad N. Hilton Humanitarian Prize, a $1.5 million prize, for its commitment to disabled people living in situations of poverty, exclusion, conflict or natural disasters. It is also a member organization of the International Disability and Development Consortium.

The Brazilian football player Neymar Jr. became an "ambassador" of Humanity & Inclusion on 15 August 2017 until April 2019.

The organization was ranked the 8th best international NGO in the world in the NGO Advisor 2017 rankings.

The organization changed its name to Humanity & Inclusion in January 2018 to better communicate "the diversity of its activities, which are not confined to supporting people with disabilities." This new identity, change of name and logo, was led by Cossette, a marketing agency in Canada. With this new name, Cossette launched the campaign "Be a lifeline" which was directed by Olivier Staub, Canadian filmmaker and photographer. This campaign won a bronze lion at Cannes Lions International Festival of Creativity in the design category in 2018.

List of "ambassadors" 

 Ross Wilson - table tennis Paralympian
 Jack Hunter-Spivey - table tennis Paralympian
 Eddie Ndopu - disability rights advocate

Notes

See also
List of disability rights organizations

References

External links
 Official website

Organizations established in 1982
Charities based in France
1982 establishments in Europe
Disability organizations based in France
Organizations based in Lyon
Nansen Refugee Award laureates